Bartholomew of Lucca, born Bartolomeo Fiadoni, and also known as Tolomeo da Lucca or Ptolemy da Lucca (c. 1236 – c. 1327), was a medieval Italian historian.

Biography
Born in Lucca, probably in 1236, at an early age Bartholomew entered the Dominican Order. He was distinguished for piety, and his intense application to study, for which reasons he won the respect and warm friendship of St. Thomas Aquinas. He was not only his disciple, but also his confidant and confessor. In 1272 he accompanied St. Thomas from Rome to Naples where he still was in 1274, when the news of his master's death at Fossa Nuova reached him. He was elected prior of the convent of his native city in 1288. At Naples (1294), he took an active part in the public demonstration which was made to prevent Pope Celestine V from resigning.

In 1301 he was elected Prior of Santa Maria Novella at Florence. Later he removed to Avignon where he was chaplain for nine years (1309–18) to Cardinal Patrasso, Bishop of Albano, and after the Cardinal's death in 1311 to his fellow-religious Cardinal William of Bayonne. Jacques Échard affirms that he was the close friend and often the confessor of John XXII, who appointed him Bishop of Torcello, March 15, 1318. A conflict with the Patriarch of Grado concerning the appointment of an abbess of St. Anthony's at Torcello led to his excommunication in 1321, and exile. In 1323 he made peace with the patriarch, returned to his see, and died there in 1327.

Works
The best-known work of Bartholomew is his Annales (1061–1303), finished about 1307, wherein are recorded in terse sentences the chief events of this period. His Historia Ecclesiastica Nova in twenty-four books relates the history of the Church from the birth of Christ till 1294; considering as appendixes the lives of Pope Boniface VIII, Pope Benedict XI, and Pope Clement V, it reaches to 1314 (Muratori, loc. cit., XI, 751 sqq.; the life of Clement V is in Baluze, Vitae pap. Aven., 23 sqq.).

He also wrote a Historia Tripartita known only from his own references and citations. The Extract[us] de chronico Fr. Ptolomaei de Luca and the Excerpta ex chronicis Fr. Ptolomaei are no longer considered original works by separate authors, but are extracts from the Historia Ecclesiastica Nova by some unknown compiler who lived after the death of Bartholomew. He is also well known for his completion of the De Regimine Principum ("On the Government of Rulers"), which Aquinas had been unable to finish before his death. This was no small task, for the share of Bartholomew begins with the sixth chapter of the second book and includes the third and fourth books (vol. XVI, in the Parma, 1865, edition of St. Thomas). Though he does not follow the order of the saint, yet his treatment is clear and logical. A committed republican, Bartholomew was central to developing a theory for the practices of Northern Italian republicanism and was the first writer to compare Aristotle's examples of mixed constitutions - Sparta, Crete, and Carthage - with the Roman Republic, the ancient Hebrew polity, the Church, and medieval communes, yet he remained a staunch defender of the absolute secular and spiritual monarchy of the pope. 

A work on the Hexaemeron by him was published by Masetti in 1880. The lives of the Avignon popes were written from original documents under his hands and were controlled by the statements of eyewitnesses. His acceptance of fables now exploded, e.g. the Popess Joan, must be attributed to the uncritical temper of his time.

Editions
 Ptolemy of Lucca. On the Government of Rulers (De Regimine Principum). Tr. James M. Blythe. Philadelphia, 1997.
 Ptolemy of Lucca.  Historia Ecclesiastica Nova: Nebst Fortsetzungen Bis 1329 [= New Ecclesiastical History, with continuations until 1329], ed. Ottavio Clavuot and Ludwig Schmugge. Monumenta Germaniae Historica Scriptores, vol. 39 (Hannover, 2009).

References 

Attribution

14th-century Italian historians
Italian Dominicans
1227 births
1327 deaths
Bishops in Veneto